This is a list of mayors of the City of Toowoomba and the Toowoomba Region, Queensland, Australia. In March 2008 the City of Toowoomba was  amalgamated with the Shires of Crows Nest, Rosalie, Jondaryan, Cambooya, Clifton, Millmerran, and Pittsworth to form the Toowoomba Region.

1861–present

References

Toowoomba

Mayors Toowoomba